Virulence is the second full-length studio album from melodic hardcore band, Only Crime. It was released on January 23, 2007 and features the same line-up as the previous album, To the Nines, including Russ Rankin from Good Riddance, Bill Stevenson from Black Flag, Descendents and ALL, Aaron Dalbec from Bane, and the Blair Brothers from Hagfish.

Track listing
All music written by Only Crime, all lyrics by Russ Rankin
"Take Me" – 2:36
"Everything For You" – 2:47  
"Shotgun"    – 3:00
"Eyes of the World" – 2:10   
"Now's the Time"    – 2:17
"In Your Eyes"    – 0:39
"Just Us"    – 2:46
"There's a Moment" – 2:38   
"This is Wretched"    – 2:17
"Too Loose"    – 1:51
"Framed Then Failed" – 2:15  
"Xanthology" – 2:39

Credits
 Russ Rankin – vocals
 Zach Blair – guitar
 Aaron Dalbec – guitar
 Doni Blair – bass
 Bill Stevenson – drums
 Recorded at the Blasting Room, Fort Collins, Colorado, U.S.
 Produced by Only Crime
 Engineered by Johhny Schou, Jason Livermore, Andrew Berlin, and Bill Stevenson

External links
Fat Wreck Chords album page
Only Crime official website
Bill Stevenson's official website

2007 albums
Only Crime albums
Fat Wreck Chords albums
Albums produced by Bill Stevenson (musician)